Aïn Zarit is a town and commune in Tiaret Province in northwestern Algeria. According to the 2008 census it has a population of 8139.

References

Communes of Tiaret Province